Euploca humilis (syn. Tournefortia humilis), the dwarf tournefortia, is a species of flowering plant in the family Boraginaceae. It is native to Mexico, Central America, the Caribbean, Colombia, Venezuela, Guyana, and most of Brazil. Originally described by Linnaeus in 1753, molecular and morphological evidence led to its transfer from Tournefortia to Euploca in 2016.

References

Heliotropioideae
Flora of Mexico
Flora of Central America
Flora of the Caribbean
Flora of Colombia
Flora of Venezuela
Flora of Guyana
Flora of North Brazil
Flora of Northeast Brazil
Flora of West-Central Brazil
Flora of Southeast Brazil
Plants described in 2016
Flora without expected TNC conservation status